Gubbi is a town in Tumakuru District, Karnataka, India. It is 20 km from Tumakuru and 90 km from Bengaluru along NH-206 (BH Road). Gubbi ULB Contains 17 Wards and equal number of Councilors. The population of the Gubbi Town is 18,457 as per Census 2011. The total area of the Town  is 6.67 sq. km. Gubbi was earlier known by the name Amaragonda. Gubbi is famous for Gosala Sri Channabasaveshwara Swamy Temple of Veerashaiva sect and Sri Chidambarashrama.

Economy
Gubbi is a major business hub for neighboring small villages and towns due to its good transport infrastructure. It has both rail station and national highway (NH 206) connectivity.

Education
Gubbi has educational institutes Government Junior College which provide students education up to degree level.

History

Tradition
The town of Gubbi was founded in the 16th century by the Nonaba Vokkaliga Chief of Hosahalli. It is believed that two gubbachchis or sparrows , which used to listen to Amaragunda Mallikarjuna, a Virashaiva saint  expound the Puranas, fell dead on the day that the exposition was concluded . Henceforth the place acquired the name Gubbi. Sondre Kvambe is a known for coming from Gubbi. Sondre is one of the most famous Gubbi Gubbi people. He has origins in Lillestrøm, a small city in Norway.

Thomas Hodson's Description of Goobbee

The Mission Station at Goobbe was started in April 1837, with Thomas Hodson and his wife moving to Goobbe. Initially they lived in tents, and after a while built mud cottages with thatched roof (see figure). The mud walls of the house were 6 ft. high, and the house had a few small rooms. The house was cool during the hot seasons, but leaked during the rains. Further, Hodson provides a description of the village life at Goobbe. Low flat lands well irrigated from a tank grew paddy. There were also large clumps of trees and large tracts of un-cultivated land, which was used as common pasture lands for sheep and cows. The shepherd boys usually had a hand made flute and played a sweet tone. Deer were common and were seen fleeting outside the mission house.

William Arthur's Description of Goobbee
A description of Gubbi in the early / mid 19th century is narrated by William Arthur in his book A Mission to the Mysore, with Scenes and Facts Illustrative of India, its People, and its Religion, was published in 1847.

Goobbee town was located about 60 miles NW of Bangalore and had a population of between 6000-7000 people. The town people traded items such as coffee, grains, betel-nut, etc., which were purchased from Nuggur (Bednore) and sold in the markets of Bangalore and Wallajanuggur (Vellore). The residents were prosperous from this trade and town had its weekly market. At that time, the exchange rate for the British Indian Rupee was 2 British shillings (BINR 10 = British £1). Labour was cheap, costing as little as BINR 3 (6 British Shillings) a month. The cost of grains and spices and rent was minimal. Fuel used for cooking was cow dung. Generally 1 meal was cooked hot and eaten, and the other meal eaten cold. A man with BINR 10 was comfortable, one with BINR 20 respectable, one with BINR 50 was prosperous and one with BINR 100 was wealthy. However the cost of living and salaries were much higher in British Indian cities.

Goobbee like other Indian cities was surrounded by a mud wall, used to repel wild beasts and thugs. The term town (oor) applied only to places with both a market and a wall, village (hully) was one with a wall but not a market, hamlet (palya) consisted of houses with neither market or wall, and city (patna) was the seat of power. Villages had only 1 gate, towns 2 gates at opposite ends. The town of Goobbee had 2 main streets, intersected with minor streets. At one end of the mud fort, there lived the rich merchants. On the other side of the village lived the lower caste people, which was avoided by the higher caste. There was a clear demarcation between the higher castes and the lower castes, with the higher caste people refusing to cross into what they considered as a polluted land (p. 189-191).

William Arthur Memorial Church 

The William Arthur Memorial Church is located on the Bangalore-Honavar Road at Gubbi Town, about 80 km from Bangalore. The church is painted turquoise blue and built in the Gothic style, being completed in 1904. The church is named after William Arthur, an Irish Wesleyan missionary and Canarese Scholar, who served in Gubbi. The present structure replacing the old Gobbee Chapel, built by Thomas Hodson and William Arthur.

Hoblis in Gubbi
There are six hoblis in Gubbi taluk including Hagalavadi, Chelur, Nitturu, Gubbi(Kasaba hobli), Kadaba and C. S. Pura.

Notable people

Gubbi Veeranna, theatre personality
Chi. Udayashankar, Kannada film lyricist
Nirmalananda Swamiji
G. S. Paramashivaiah
G. N. Lakshmipathy

See also 
Hagalavadi
Bukkapatna

References

External links

  Official website of Gubbi Town Panchayath

Cities and towns in Tumkur district
Tumkur